Just Us is a 1986 television film, based on a true story and the autobiography by Gabrielle Carey, of the same name. Set in Sydney, Australia, but filmed mainly in Melbourne, it starred Scott Burgess and Catherine McClements. It was written by Ted Roberts and directed by Gordon Glenn.

Plot
The autobiography written by Gabrielle Carey tells her story of how she made the 'mistake' of falling in love with Terry Haley, a prison inmate at Parramatta Gaol.

The character's names were changed for the movie, in which, Jessica Taylor (McClements), a young journalist, is sent to a maximum security prison to watch a debate and gather up information for a story she is writing. It is there that she meets long-term prisoner Billy Carter (Burgess), and after a while, the pair fall in love and want to get married.

Cast
 Scott Burgess as Billy Carter
 Catherine McClements as Jessica Taylor
 Gina Riley as Cathy
 Jay Mannering as Max
 Merfyn Owen as Royce
 Denis Moore as Christie
 Kym Gyngell as The Mouth
 Marie Redshaw as Mrs Carter
 Ron Pinnell as Mr Carter

Filming locations
Just Us was filmed in Melbourne, though set in Sydney and Adelaide. The locations of both Parramatta Gaol and Yatala Gaol was filmed using the exterior and interior of Old Melbourne Gaol. 
Other notable locations included:
 South Melbourne Rowing Club
 Kew Asylum
 Melbourne Magistrates' Court
 Brighton Junior Grammar School

References

External links

Just Us by Peter Malone

1986 television films
1986 films
Australian television films
Films shot in Melbourne
Films based on works by Australian writers
1980s English-language films